Deportivo Rayo Cantabria is a Spanish football team based in Santander, in the autonomous community of Cantabria. Founded in 1993 it last played in Tercera División – Group 3, holding home games at the Campo Municipal Mies de Cozada sports ground, which they share with a Segunda Regional football side (Juventud Atlético San Román) and a División de Honor rugby club (Independiente Rugby Club).  Before they played at the Campos de San Juan de Monte''.

History
The original Rayo Cantabria was founded in 1926 as Gimnástica de Miranda, later being renamed Sociedad Deportiva Rayo Cantabria and acting as Racing de Santander's farm team from 1951. The club spent 20 consecutive years in the old Tercera División when it was the third tier of Spanish football, then dropped down the levels, competing for  just one further season at that level (Segunda División B) after restructuring – that was in 1987–88, and they were relegated. In 1993, the original Rayo was dissolved in a national move to formally absorb affiliated teams into the professional clubs' structure, and Racing de Santander B took its place.

The new Deportivo Rayo Cantabria, who started playing as an independent club in the regional leagues from 1993, was also affiliated to Racing four seasons, from 2003–04 to 2006–07. The reformed Rayo have never achieved promotion to Segunda B, although they took part in the promotion playoffs three times (having finished ahead of Racing B in the table each time).

The club was excluded from competing in the 2018–19 Tercera División due to unpaid debts, and did not enter any competitions in 2019–20 either. In their absence, in summer 2019 Racing de Santander successfully applied to have their B-team renamed as Rayo Cantabria going forward.

In September 2018, despite the recent problems at the club, chief executive Ángel Meñaca was recognised by the city of Santander for his lifetime efforts and contributions towards the running both the 'original' Rayo up to 1993 and the new Rayo from then on.

Season to season

14 seasons in Tercera División

Famous players

 Iván Bolado
 Mikaël Cantave
 Jorzolino Falkenstein
 Saša Kolman
 Edwin Muñoz
 Yefri Reyes

Related teams
Racing de Santander B

References

External links
Official website 
Futbolme team profile 

Football clubs in Cantabria
Association football clubs established in 1993
1993 establishments in Spain